Max Mirnyi and Horia Tecău were the defending champions, but chose not to participate together.  Mirnyi played alongside Feliciano López, but lost in the quarterfinals to Julien Benneteau and Vasek Pospisil.
Tecău teamed up with Jean-Julien Rojer and successfully defended the title, defeating Benneteau and Pospisil in the final, 6–7(6–8), 7–5, [10–5].

Seeds

Draw

Draw

Qualifying

Qualifying seeds

Qualifiers
  Johan Brunström  /  Nicholas Monroe

Lucky losers
  Teymuraz Gabashvili /  Mikhail Kukushkin

Qualifying draw

References
 Main Draw

Open Mens Doubles